The Llŷn Coastal Path is a waymarked  long-distance footpath running along the coast of the Llŷn Peninsula from Caernarfon to Porthmadog in Gwynedd, north-west Wales. A large part of the Llŷn Peninsula is designated an Area of Outstanding Natural Beauty.

Devised and implemented by Gwynedd County Council and the Countryside Council for Wales, the path opened in 2006, though it has since been changed and improved.

Description
Snowdonia, Wales’ biggest National Park, lies to the east and the Irish Sea to the west. The weather in these parts can be unpredictable.
 
The Coastal Path is partly based on an ancient pilgrimage route to Bardsey Island, now a National Nature Reserve.

Wildlife is abundant in this area, and bottle-nosed dolphins and Atlantic grey seals can often be seen in the coastal waters. In the dunes there are stonechats, goldfinches, and sand martins.  Migratory birds pass this way too, so autumn brings the arrival of redwings, chaffinches, starlings and skylarks. The rare chough breeds in small numbers.

The route
The route can be split into seven main sections, though the official guidebook divides it into nine.
 Caernarfon–Trefor
 Caernarfon–Llanfaglan
 Llanfaglan–Groeslon
 Groeslon–Aberdesach
 Aberdesach–Trefor
 Trefor–Morfa Nefyn
 Trefor–Penrhyn Glas
 Penrhyn Glas–Porth Dinllaen
 Morfa Nefyn–Llangwnnadl
 Porth Dinllaen–Porth Ysgaden
 Porth Ysgaden–Porth Widlin
 Llangwnnadl–Aberdaron
 Porth Widlin–Porth Orion
 Porth Orion–Aberdaron
 Aberdaron–Abersoch
 Aberdaron–Plas yn Rhiw
 Plas yn Rhiw–Porth Neigwl
 Porth Neigwl–Machroes
 Machroes–Llanbedrog Beach
 Abersoch–Pwllheli
 Llanbedrog Beach–Pwllheli
 Pwllheli–Criccieth–Porthmadog
 Pwllheli–Pen-ychain
 Pen-ychain–Criccieth
 Criccieth–Porthmadog

See also
North Wales Path
Anglesey Coastal Path
Ceredigion Coast Path

References

External links
Gwynedd Council information of The Llŷn Coastal Path
Photos of the Llyn Coastal Path on geograph.org.uk
Map

Recreational walks in Wales
Tourism in Gwynedd
Long-distance footpaths in Wales
Coastal paths in Wales
Llŷn Peninsula